La Romieu is a commune in the Gers department in southwestern France.

It is known for its magnificent Collégiale St. Pierre, a 14th-century church with a cloister and a tower.

Geography

Population

Sights

Jardins de Coursiana

See also
Communes of the Gers department

References

Communes of Gers
World Heritage Sites in France